Bridgwater and West Somerset is a constituency represented in the House of Commons of the UK Parliament since 2010 by Ian Liddell-Grainger, a Conservative.

History
Bridgwater was one of the original parliamentary borough constituencies in England (with fifteen years of non-existence in the late 19th century after the seat was abolished for corruption in 1870 and being subsumed into a slightly larger seat on a review of Somerset's representation by the Boundary Commission in 1885).

In 2010 seven candidates stood.  The second placed candidate was a Liberal Democrat, Theo Butt Philip, 11.2% ahead of the candidate from the Labour Party.  The incumbent, Ian Liddell-Grainger, is a former Major in the Territorial Army, farmer and defence advisor.

In the snap election of 2017 Liddell-Grainger increased his majority to 15,000, the largest in the constituency's history, and Labour finished second in the seat for the first time.

Boundaries

The District of Sedgemoor wards of Bridgwater Bower, Bridgwater Eastover, Bridgwater Hamp, Bridgwater Quantock, Bridgwater Sydenham, Bridgwater Victoria, Cannington and Quantocks, East Poldens, Huntspill and Pawlett, King's Isle, North Petherton, Puriton, Sandford, West Poldens, and Woolavington, and the District of West Somerset.

Members of Parliament 
See also: Bridgwater constituency

Elections

Elections in the 2010s

The Liberal Democrats initially selected Justine Baker as their candidate. After being accepted for Bridgwater and West Somerset, Baker resigned in order to apply to stand as the candidate for Taunton Deane, a more 'winnable' seat; she was not successful, and ultimately was not a candidate anywhere at the 2015 general election. She was replaced by Theo Butt Philip, who had been the Liberal Democrat candidate at the 2010 general election.

* Served as the MP for Bridgwater 2001–2010

See also 
 List of parliamentary constituencies in Somerset

Notes

References

External links 
nomis Constituency Profile for Bridgwater and West Somerset – presenting data from the ONS annual population survey and other official statistics.

Bridgwater West Somerset
Bridgwater West Somerset